Nicolas Jean Cerf (born 1965) is a Belgian physicist. He is professor of quantum mechanics and information theory at the Université Libre de Bruxelles and a member of the Royal Academies for Science and the Arts of Belgium. He received his Ph.D. at the Université Libre de Bruxelles in 1993, and was a researcher at the Université de Paris 11 and the California Institute of Technology.  He is the director of the Center for Quantum Information and Computation at the 
Université Libre de Bruxelles.

Research

Together with Christoph Adami, he defined the quantum version of conditional and mutual entropies, which are basic notions of Shannon's information theory, and discovered that quantum information can be negative (a pair of entangled particles was coined a qubit-antiqubit pair). This has led to important results in quantum information sciences, for example quantum state merging. He is best known today for his work on quantum information with continuous variables. He found a Gaussian quantum cloning transformation  (see no-cloning theorem) and invented a Gaussian quantum key distribution protocol, which is the continuous counterpart of the so-called BB84 protocol, making a link with Shannon's theory of Gaussian channels. This has led to the first experimental demonstration of continuous-variable quantum key distribution with optical coherent states and homodyne detection.

Honors

He received the Caltech President’s Fund Award in 1997,  and the Marie Curie Excellence Award  in 2006.

Works

References

External links
 
 

Living people
Vrije Universiteit Brussel alumni
1965 births
Academic staff of the Université libre de Bruxelles
Belgian physicists
Theoretical physicists